Rampillon is a commune in the Seine-et-Marne department in the Île-de-France region in north-central France.

The inhabitants are called  Rampillonnais. It is home to the 13th-century church of Sainte Eliphe, with a portal decorated with a "Final Judgement" and a calendar.

See also
Communes of the Seine-et-Marne department

References

External links

1999 Land Use, from IAURIF (Institute for Urban Planning and Development of the Paris-Île-de-France région) 

Communes of Seine-et-Marne